The Vardon Trophy is awarded by the PGA of America to the PGA Tour's leader in scoring average. When the award was first given in 1937, it was awarded on the basis of a points system. No award was given from 1942–1946 due to World War II. In 1947, the PGA began awarding it for low scoring average. In 1988, the trophy began going to the golfer with the lowest adjusted scoring average over a minimum of 60 rounds, with no mid-round withdrawals (instituted in 1988). The trophy is named for the Jersey golfing great Harry Vardon, who died in 1937.

The PGA Tour presents its own Byron Nelson Award annually to the player with the lowest adjusted scoring average for the year. It has a 50-round minimum, and was instituted in 1980.

For both awards, non-medal rounds (such as in the WGC-Accenture Match Play Championship and The International) count towards the minimum number of rounds but are not included in the calculation of the scoring average.

Differences in the eligibility criteria for the awards have resulted in different players winning the awards on six occasions. In 1988, 1993, and 1995, Greg Norman won the Byron Nelson Award but not the Vardon Trophy because he failed to meet the 60 round minimum for the Vardon Trophy (52, 54, and 58 rounds, respectively). This also happened to Tiger Woods in 2006 (55 rounds) and Steve Stricker in 2013 (51 rounds). In 1989, Payne Stewart failed to qualify for the Vardon Trophy because of his mid-round withdrawal from the AT&T Pebble Beach National Pro-Am. In 1987, Dan Pohl won the Vardon Trophy even though David Frost and Paul Azinger both had lower averages; Frost and Azinger were not PGA of America members, a requirement for eligibility that was dropped after the 1987 season. The minimum rounds required also dropped from 80 to 60 at that time.

For the 2019–20 season, the minimum rounds required to be eligible for the trophy was reduced from 60 to 44, due to cancellation of tournaments because of the COVID-19 pandemic. The minimum rounds for the Byron Nelson Award dropped from 50 to 35.

Winners

Multiple winners
Sixteen men have won the Vardon Trophy more than once (1937–2020).

9 wins
Tiger Woods: 1999, 2000, 2001, 2002, 2003, 2005, 2007, 2009, 2013
5 wins
Billy Casper: 1960, 1963, 1965, 1966, 1968
Lee Trevino: 1970, 1971, 1972, 1974, 1980
4 wins
Arnold Palmer: 1961, 1962, 1964, 1967
Sam Snead: 1938, 1949, 1950, 1955
Rory McIlroy: 2012, 2014, 2019, 2022
3 wins
Ben Hogan: 1940, 1941, 1948
Greg Norman: 1989, 1990, 1994
Tom Watson: 1977, 1978, 1979
2 wins
Fred Couples: 1991, 1992
Bruce Crampton: 1973, 1975
Dustin Johnson: 2016, 2018
Tom Kite: 1981, 1982
Lloyd Mangrum: 1951, 1953
Nick Price: 1993, 1997
Jordan Spieth: 2015, 2017

Seven men have won the Byron Nelson Award more than once (1980–2020).

9 wins
Tiger Woods: 1999, 2000, 2001, 2002, 2003, 2005, 2006, 2007, 2009
5 wins
Greg Norman: 1988, 1990, 1993, 1994, 1995
4 wins
Rory McIlroy: 2012, 2014, 2019, 2022
2 wins
Fred Couples: 1991, 1992
Dustin Johnson: 2016, 2018
Tom Kite: 1981, 1982
Jordan Spieth: 2015, 2017

References

External links
PGA Vardon Trophy Winners at about.com
Byron Nelson Award at about.com

PGA Tour
Golf awards in the United States
Awards established in 1937